Port Austin may refer to a location in the United States:

 Port Austin, Michigan, a village
 Port Austin Township, Michigan
 Port Austin Lighthouse in Lake Huron north of the village